The 2017–18 season is Tractor's 10th season in the Persian Gulf Pro League. They will also be competing in the Hazfi Cup & AFC Champions League. Tractor is captained by Mehdi Kiani.

Club

Management

First Team Squad

Current squad

Transfers

Summer 

In:

Out:

Winter 

In:

Out:

Competitions

Overview

Persian Gulf Pro League

Standings

Results summary

Results by round

Matches

Hazfi Cup

Matches

AFC Champions League

Group stage

Statistics

Squad statistics

|-
! colspan=14 style=background:#dcdcdc; text-align:center| Players transferred out during the season

Goals

Clean sheets

See also
 2017–18 Iran Pro League
 2017–18 Hazfi Cup

References

Sport in Tabriz
Tractor S.C. seasons
Tractor Sazi